Sarmad Kashani, or simply Sarmad (ca. 1590–1661) was a Persian-speaking Armenian mystic and poet who travelled to and made the Indian subcontinent his permanent home during the 17th century. Originally Jewish, he may have renounced his religion to adopt Islam. However "his conversion was probably only nominal and superficial, since he himself later warned the Jews not to convert themselves". Sarmad, in his poetry, states that he is neither Jewish, nor Muslim, nor Hindu.

Early life
Sarmad was born in Armenia around 1590, to a family of Jewish Persian-speaking Armenian merchants. Sarmad had an excellent command of Persian, essential for his work as a merchant, and composed most of his works in this language. He produced a translation of the Torah in Persian. He studied under Mulla Sadra and Mir Findiriski before migrating to the Mughal Empire as a merchant.

Travels in the Mughal Empire
Hearing that precious items and works of art were being purchased in India at high prices, Sarmad gathered together his wares and traveled to the Mughal Empire where he intended to sell them. In Thatta, in present day Sindh, Pakistan, one of his close disciples was a Hindu called Abhay Chand. Although there is debate on the nature of their relationship very little is known about the life of Abhay Chand and no historical records to confirm the details of their encounter, except Sarmad's own poetry. Some scholars have argued that, while Sarmad employed Abhay Chand to translate the Torah as well as Old Testament and New Testament,  it is possible that Abhay Chand converted to Islam or Judaism. It is important to note that, in later years, Sarmad grew critical of all religions and took a more spiritual position.

At some stage, he abandoned his wealth, let his hair grow, stopped clipping his nails and began to wander the city streets. Although it is widely speculated that Sarmad and Abhay Chand moved to Lahore, then to Hyderabad, settling finally in Delhi, however there are no credible sources to confirm the events.

Life in Delhi
The reputation as a poet and mystic he had acquired during the time the two travelled together, caused the Mughal crown prince Dara Shikoh to invite Sarmad at his father's court. On this occasion, Sarmad so deeply impressed the royal heir that he vowed to become his disciple.

Sarmad has been witnessed by the French physician and traveler, François Bernier, who reported Sarmad as a naked faqir.

Sexuality 
Abhay Chand was a Hindu disciple of Sarmad Kashani. The nature of their relationship is debated by historians. There are no historical records to confirm the details of their encounter, except Sarmad's own poetry. The biography of Sarmad Kashani published by caretakers of his shrine states that he had fallen for a Hindu boy named Abhai Chand whose father eventually relented and allowed them to be together.

Death
After the War of Succession with his brother Dara Shikoh, Aurangzeb (1658-1707) emerged victorious, killed his former adversary and ascended the imperial throne. He had Sarmad arrested and tried for heresy. Sarmad was put to death by beheading in 1661. His grave is located near the Jama Masjid in Delhi, India.

Sarmad was accused and convicted of atheism and unorthodox religious practice.

Aurangzeb ordered his Ulema to ask Sarmad why he repeated only "There is no God", and ordered him to recite the second part,"but Allah". To that he replied that "I am still absorbed with the negative part. Why should I tell a lie?" Thus he sealed his death sentence. Ali Khan-Razi, Aurangzeb's court chronicler, was present at the execution. He relates some of the mystic's verses uttered at the execution stand: "The Mullahs say Ahmed went to heaven, Sarmad says that heaven came down to Ahmed." ... "There was an uproar and we opened our eyes from the eternal sleep. Saw that the night of wickedness endured, so we slept again."

Abul Kalam Azad on Sarmad
Abul Kalam Azad, one of the leading political personalities involved in the Indian independence movement, compared himself to Sarmad, for his freedom of thought and expression.

See also
 Dabestan-e Mazaheb

References

Bibliography

Rubā‘iyyāt-i Sarmad, ed. Fazl Mahmud Asiri, with a preface by S. Qazvini, Prabhat Kumar Mukherjee Shantiniketan (Visva Bharati Series 11), Shantiniketan 1950. 
Abul Kalam Azad, Sarmad Shahid IN:  S. S. Hameed, The Rubayat of Sarmad, New Delhi 1991, p.18-41.
Cook, D. (2007) Martyrdom in Islam (Cambridge) .
 
Ezekial, I.A. (1966) Sarmad: Jewish Saint of India (Beas) ASIN B0006EXYM6.
Gupta, M.G. (2000) Sarmad the Saint: Life and Works (Agra) .
Katz, N. (2000) The Identity of a Mystic: The Case of Sa'id Sarmad, a Jewish-Yogi-Sufi Courtier of the Mughals in: Numen 47: 142-160.
Rai, L. (1978) Sarmad. His Life and Rubais, Hanumanprasad Poddar Smarak Samita, Gorakhpur.
Schimmel, A. And Muhammad Is His Messenger: The Veneration Of the Prophet In Islamic Piety (Chapel Hill & London).
Sarmad di Kashan. Dio ama la bellezza del mio peccato. Le quartine di un poeta mistico della tradizione indo-persiana, ed. Carlo Saccone, Centro Essad Bey-Amazon IP, Seattle 2022

External resources

Sarmad, Mohammed Sa'id
Majid Sheikh, Sarmad the Armenian and Dara Shikoh
Sarmad, a mystic poet beheaded in 1661 

Sarmad
Sarmad
Sarmad
Sarmad
1661 deaths
Year of birth unknown
17th-century Indian poets
Sufi mystics
Converts to Islam from Judaism
History of Delhi
Mughal Empire Sufis
People executed by the Mughal Empire
Executed Indian people
Converts to Hinduism from Islam
Iranian Hindus